Ten of Cups is a Minor Arcana tarot card.

Tarot cards are used throughout much of Europe to play tarot card games.

In English-speaking countries, where the games are largely unknown, tarot cards came to be utilized primarily for divinatory purposes.

Divination usage
In many decks, the Ten of Cups appears in the form of a series of ten cups arranged in a rainbow, being contemplated by a young couple, their arms raised in wonder. Nearby, two young children are seen playing. In other decks, the rainbow image is removed and the children are not evident, but in most cases, the cups are arranged upright and a young happy couple is pictured.

The divinatory message is evident in this image, in that it represents fortunate marriage, contentment of the heart, and the perfection of human love and friendship. It can also refer to the town or country where the querent lives. This is one of the most positive cards in the entire Tarot deck. Reversed, it can refer to quarreling, violence, and a troubled heart.

Other divinatory meanings include a peaceful environment and (reversed) a disrupted routine, and selfish exploitation.

Within some esoteric disciplines, such as the Order of the Golden Dawn, each of the forty pip cards of the Tarot deck is assigned and attributed to one of the four letters of the tetragrammaton and one of the ten sephiroth of the Tree of Life. In the case of the Ten of Cups, this attribution is to the tenth sephirah of Malkuth and the letter ה (Heh). The correlation between the two terms in this combination leads to a symbolic title for each card. In the case of this card, that key name is Perpetual success.

Rider–Waite symbolism

 The image appears remarkably idyllic, rustic.
 Besides the Seven of Cups, this is the only card in the suit where the cups are up in the air and not physically supported. This may show contentment which is not based on material circumstance, or a lack of material consideration.

References

Suit of Cups